, better known by his stage name Toru, is a guitarist and the leader of the Japanese rock band One Ok Rock.

He was in the hip-hop dance group Heads along with Ryota Kohama from One Ok Rock before they disbanded in 2002.

Personal life 

Toru was born in Osaka, Japan before moving to Tokyo. Ryota Kohama, bassist from One Ok Rock, is his childhood friend. With two other men, Kohei and Takuya, Toru and Ryota formed a hip-hop dance group called Heads when they were fifth and sixth-graders. They participated in dance competitions in the late 1990s, between the years 1995 to 1999.

On July 28, 2020, it was announced that Yamashita had been tested positive for COVID-19.

On December 28, 2021 Toru announced on his Instagram that he is now married to actress and model Aya Omasa.

Career 

They debuted with a single entitled "screeeem!" in July 2000 and followed with "Gooood or Bad!" in November, produced for Amuse, Inc. The group performed every weekend in Osaka's Kyoubashi and Tokyo's Akihabara, shopping and amusement districts.

HEADS disbanded in 2002 and in 2003 they took a break to improve their abilities. They merged into a new group with seven other members and were called GROUND 0.

In 2005 Toru took a main role in TV series Shibuya Fifteen. He contributed a cameo as a high school student in Kamen Rider Hibiki. That year, he invited Ryota, their upperclassman Alex and his friend Koyanagi Yuu to form a rock band. Later, Toru become the leader of this band, later named ONE OK ROCK. He met Takahiro Moriuchi when he performed with his previous band and then stalked him until he joined One Ok Rock, after repeated rejections. After Alex quit the band, Yamashita took his place, playing lead-guitar.

He is heavily influenced by American bands Foo Fighters, The Smashing Pumpkins, Enter Shikari, Linkin Park, Good Charlotte, Sleeping With Sirens, Nirvana, The Used, Avril Lavigne, and Biffy Clyro.

Equipment 

Toru Yamashita uses many guitars from time to time. Toru used Gibson Les Paul guitars in early One Ok Rock live concerts. He started with a Gibson Les Paul Standard Black and then purchased a Les Paul Custom Alpine White in 2009. Four years later, this guitar was signed by the members of Fall Out Boy on the front side and Avril Lavigne on the rear side. Toru has first seen using PRS Guitars during the band's final tour at Nippon Budokan. During the JinseixBoku era, he changed most of his guitar to PRS Guitars and hasn't been seen playing his Gibson Les Paul guitars as often. Recently, he has been using Fender Stratocaster since Eye of the Storm tour.

Filmography

TV series

Collaborations

See also 
 One Ok Rock discography

References

External links 

  
 Official Toru Instagram

1988 births
Living people
Musicians from Osaka Prefecture
People from Moriguchi, Osaka
Japanese rock musicians
Japanese rock guitarists
21st-century guitarists
One Ok Rock members